Tony Haynes may refer to:

 Tony Haynes (English composer) (born 1941), English composer
 Tony Haynes (American musician) (born 1960), American musician